Mark Wayne Clark (May 1, 1896 – April 17, 1984) was a United States Army officer who saw service during World War I, World War II, and the Korean War. He was the youngest four-star general in the US Army during World War II.

During World War I, he was a company commander and served in France in 1918, as a 22-year-old captain, where he was seriously wounded by shrapnel. After the war, the future US Army Chief of Staff, General George C. Marshall, noticed Clark's abilities. During World War II, he commanded the United States Fifth Army, and later the 15th Army Group, in the Italian campaign. He is known for leading the Fifth Army when it captured Rome in June 1944, around the same time as the Normandy landings.

Clark has been heavily criticized for ignoring the orders of his superior officer, British General Sir Harold Alexander, commanding the Allied Armies in Italy (AAI), and for allowing the German 10th Army to slip away, in his drive to take Rome, the capital of Italy but not strategically important. Clark ordered Lucian Truscott, commanding U.S. VI Corps, to select Operation Turtle (moving towards Rome) rather than Operation Buffalo (moving to cut Route 6 at Valmontone), which Alexander had ordered. Clark had, however, left Operation Turtle as an option if Operation Buffalo ran into difficulty. The German 10th Army then joined the rest of the German army group at the Trasimene Line.

On March 10, 1945, at the age of 48, Clark became one of the youngest American officers  promoted to the rank of four-star general. Dwight D. Eisenhower, a close friend, considered Clark to be a brilliant staff officer and trainer of men.

Throughout his thirty-seven years of military service, Clark was awarded many medals, the Distinguished Service Cross (DSC), the US Army's second-highest award, being the most notable.

A legacy of the "Clark Task Force," which he led from 1953 to 1955 to review and to make recommendations on all federal intelligence activities, is the term "intelligence community."

Early life and career
Clark was born in Madison Barracks, Sackets Harbor, New York, but spent much of his youth in Highland Park, Illinois, while his father, Charles Carr Clark, a career infantry officer in the United States Army, was stationed at Fort Sheridan. His mother, Rebecca "Beckie" Ezekkiels, was the daughter of Romanian Jews; Mark Clark was baptized Episcopalian as a cadet at the United States Military Academy at West Point, New York.

Clark gained an early appointment to the USMA in June 1913 at the age of 17, but lost time from frequent illnesses. Known as "Contraband" by his classmates, because of his ability to smuggle sweets into the barracks, while at West Point, he met and befriended Dwight D. Eisenhower, who lived in the same barracks division and was his company cadet sergeant. Although Eisenhower was two years senior to him and had graduated as part of the West Point class of 1915, both formed a friendship. Clark graduated from West Point on April 20, 1917, exactly two weeks after the American entry into World War I, and six weeks before schedule, with a class ranking of 110 in a class of 139, and was commissioned as a second lieutenant in the Infantry Branch. He graduated alongside young men such as Matthew Ridgway, J. Lawton Collins, (both of whom later became U.S. Army Chief of Staff) Ernest N. Harmon, William W. Eagles, Norman Cota, Laurence B. Keiser, John M. Devine, Albert C. Smith, Frederick A. Irving, Charles H. Gerhardt, Bryant Moore and William K. Harrison. All of these men would, like Clark himself, rise to high command and become generals.

Like his father, he decided to join the Infantry Branch. He was assigned to the 11th Infantry Regiment, which later became part of the 5th Division, where he became a company commander in Company 'K' of the 3rd Battalion, 11th Infantry, with First Lieutenant John W. O'Daniel serving as a platoon commander in his company. In the rapid expansion of the U.S. Army during World War I, he rose quickly in rank, promoted to first lieutenant on May 15 and captain on August 5, 1917.

In late April 1918, shortly before Clark's 22nd birthday and over a year after his graduation from West Point, he arrived on the Western Front, to join the American Expeditionary Forces (AEF). Arriving with his company at the French port of Brest on 1 May, his 22nd birthday, the next few weeks were spent in training in trench warfare under the tutelage of the French Army and soon afterwards the division was inspected by General John "Blackjack" Pershing, the Commander-in-Chief (C-in-C) of the AEF on the Western Front. Serving in the Vosges mountains, the Commanding Officer (CO) of the regiment's 3rd Battalion, Major R. E. Kingman, fell ill and Clark was promoted to acting battalion commander on June 12, 1918, with O'Daniel taking over command of Clark's company. Two days later, when Clark's division was relieving a French division in the trenches, he was wounded by German artillery in the right shoulder and upper back, knocking him unconscious; the soldier standing next to him, Private Joseph Kanieski, was killed. They were two of the first casualties suffered by the 5th Division during the war.

Captain Clark  recovered from his injuries within six weeks, but was graded unfit to return to the infantry, being transferred to the Supply Section of the First Army. In this position he served with Colonel John L. DeWitt, and supervised the daily provision of food for the men of the First Army, which earned Clark recognition at the higher levels of command. He stayed in this post until the end of hostilities on November 11, 1918. He then served with the Third Army in its occupation duties in Germany and returned to the United States in June 1919, just over a year after he was sent overseas.

Interwar period

During the interwar period, Clark served in a variety of staff and training roles. From 1921 to 1924, he served as an aide in the office of the Assistant Secretary of War. In 1925, he completed the professional officer's course at the US Army Infantry School and then served as a staff officer with the 30th Infantry Regiment at The Presidio in San Francisco, California. His next assignment was as a training instructor to the Indiana Army National Guard, in which he was promoted to major on January 14, 1933, more than 15 years after his promotion to captain.

Major Clark served as a deputy commander of the Civilian Conservation Corps district in Omaha, Nebraska, in 1935–1936, between tours at the U.S. Army Command and General Staff School in 1935 and the U.S. Army War College in 1937. Among his classmates there were Matthew Ridgway, Walter Bedell Smith and Geoffrey Keyes, all of whom he would serve with during World War II.

Assigned to Fort Lewis, Washington, Clark was selected by General George C. Marshall, the newly promoted Army Chief of Staff, to instruct at the U.S. Army War College in March 1940, where he received a promotion to lieutenant colonel on July 1. Clark and Brigadier General Lesley J. McNair, later the commander of Army Ground Forces, selected the thousands of acres of unused land in Louisiana for military maneuvers in the Louisiana Maneuvers. On August 4, 1941, Clark, skipping the rank of colonel, was promoted two grades to the temporary rank of brigadier general as the U.S. Army geared up for entry into World War II, and made Assistant Chief of Staff (G-3) at General Headquarters, United States Army, in Washington, D.C.

World War II
In January 1942, a month after the Japanese attack on Pearl Harbor and the American entry into World War II, Clark was appointed Deputy Chief of Staff of Army Ground Forces (AGF), commanded by Lieutenant General Lesley J. McNair, and in May 1942 became its Chief of Staff.

Service in Europe and North Africa

On April 17, 1942 Clark was temporarily promoted to the two-star rank of major general. Two weeks before his 46th birthday he was the youngest major general in the U.S. Army. In June, Clark, along with Major General Dwight Eisenhower, was sent to England as Commanding General (CG) of II Corps, and the next month moved up to CG, Army Forces in the European Theater of Operations (ETO). Along with Eisenhower, he was sent to work out the feasibility of a cross-channel invasion of German-occupied Europe that year, based on the Germany first strategy, which had been agreed on by American and British military and political leaders the year before if the United States were to enter the conflict. In England Clark first met the British Prime Minister, Winston Churchill, who was much impressed by Clark, referring to him as "The American Eagle", along with General Sir Alan Brooke, the Chief of the Imperial General Staff (CIGS, the professional head of the British Army), and Lieutenant General Bernard Montgomery, then commander of the South Eastern Command. After a cross-channel invasion was ruled out for 1942, attention was turned to planning for an Allied invasion of French North Africa, given the codename of Operation Gymnast, later Operation Torch. In October, Clark was assigned to the Mediterranean Theater of Operations (MTO) as deputy to Eisenhower, who was now the Supreme Allied Commander in the theater, relinquishing command of II Corps. Clark's duty was to prepare for Operation Torch. Clark also made a covert visit to French North Africa (see Operation Flagpole) to meet with pro-Allied officers of the Vichy French forces.

Fifth Army and service in Italy

Eisenhower greatly appreciated Clark's contributions. Clark, at the age of 46, was promoted to the temporary rank of lieutenant general on November 11, 1942, three days after the Torch landings. He was the youngest three-star general in the U.S. Army. On January 5, 1943, the United States created its first field army overseas, the Fifth Army, with Clark as its CG, although neither Clark nor Fifth Army saw service in the fighting in North Africa. Many officers, most notably Major General George S. Patton, Jr., who was both older and senior to Clark, and was then commanding I Armored Corps, came to resent him, believing he had advanced too quickly. Patton, in particular, believed Clark was "too damned slick" and believed Clark was much too concerned with himself. In the presence of senior commanders Patton and Clark were friendly, although Patton, in his journal, wrote "I think that if you treat a skunk nicely, he will not piss on you—as often", referring to Clark after both he and General Marshall, the Army Chief of Staff, visited Patton's headquarters as the latter explained his plans for the upcoming invasion of Sicily. Clark, for his part, claimed he found it difficult to command men who had been his senior, and he proved reluctant to remove those commanders if they failed in battle. The Fifth Army's initial mission was preparing to keep a surveillance on Spanish Morocco. His permanent rank was upgraded to brigadier general on September 1, 1943.

On September 9, 1943, the Fifth Army, composed of the U.S. VI Corps, under Major General Ernest J. Dawley—who was a decade older than Clark and about whom Clark had doubts—and the British X Corps, under Lieutenant General Sir Richard L. McCreery—to whom Clark later scornfully referred as a "feather duster"—under Clark's command landed at Salerno (codenamed Operation Avalanche). The invasion, despite good initial progress, was nearly defeated over the next few days by numerous German counterattacks, and Major General Dawley, the VI Corps commander, was sacked and replaced by Major General John P. Lucas, who himself was later sacked and replaced after his perceived failure during Operation Shingle. Clark was subsequently criticized by historians and critics for this near-failure, blamed on poor planning by Clark and his staff. Despite this Clark was later awarded the Distinguished Service Cross (DSC), the citation for which reads:

The Fifth Army, by now composed of five American divisions (the 3rd, 34th, 36th and 45th Infantry, along with the 82nd Airborne) and three British divisions (7th Armoured, 46th and 56th Infantry), operating alongside the British Eighth Army, under General Bernard Montgomery, subsequently advanced up the spine of Italy, and captured the Italian city of Naples on October 1, 1943 and crossed the Volturno Line in mid-October. Progress, however, soon began to slow down, due to German resistance, lack of Allied manpower in Italy, and the formidable German defenses known as the Winter Line, which was to hold the Allies up for the next six months.

During the Battle of Monte Cassino, Clark ordered the bombing of the Abbey on 15 February 1944. This was under direct orders from his superior, British General Sir Harold R. L. G. Alexander, Commander-in-Chief (C-in-C) of the Allied Armies in Italy (AAI). Clark and his chief of staff, Major General Alfred Gruenther, remained unconvinced of the military necessity of the bombing. When handing over the U.S. II Corps position to the New Zealand Corps, under Lieutenant General Sir Bernard C. Freyberg, the Assistant Division Commander (ADC) of the U.S. 34th Infantry Division, Brigadier General Frederic B. Butler, claimed "I don't know, but I don't believe the enemy is in the convent. All the fire has been from the slopes of the hill below the wall." The commander of the 4th Indian Infantry Division, Major General Francis Tuker, urged the bombing of the entire massif with the heaviest bombs available. Clark finally pinned down the Commander-in-Chief, Alexander, recounting that "I said, 'You give me a direct order and we'll do it' and he did."

Clark's conduct of operations in the Italian campaign is controversial, particularly during the actions around the German Winter Line, such as the U.S. 36th Infantry Division's assault on the Gari river in January 1944, which failed with 1,681 casualties and nothing gained. American military historian Carlo D'Este called Clark's choice to take the undefended Italian capital of Rome, after Operation Diadem and the breakout from the Anzio beachhead, in early June, rather than focusing on the destruction of the German 10th Army, "as militarily stupid as it was insubordinate". Although Clark described a "race to Rome" and released an edited version of his diary for the official historians, his complete papers became available only after his death. In his recent book, Stalin’s War: A New History of World War II (2021), Sean McMeekin raises an intriguing though unsubstantiated possibility (in a footnote) about Clark’s motives for taking Rome two days before Operation Overlord. “Although usually excoriated for vainglory,” McMeekin writes, “Clark’s action could be interpreted as a protest against the Stalin-pleasing decision at Teheran [the conference of the “Big Three” Allied leaders, at which both Roosevelt and Churchill bent to Stalin’s war aims with only a loose commitment on the Soviet leader’s part to launch a corresponding operation in the east on D-Day] to shortchange Italy of troops, landing craft, and warplanes and throw everything into Overlord instead.”

Clark led the Fifth Army, now much reduced in manpower, having given up both the U.S. VI Corps and the French Expeditionary Corps (CEF) for Operation Dragoon, the Allied invasion of Southern France (which Clark had always opposed), throughout the battles around the Gothic Line. For the offensive, Clark's Fifth Army (now composed only of the II Corps—with the 34th and 85th Infantry Divisions—under Major General Geoffrey Keyes, and the IV Corps—with the 88th and 91st Infantry Divisions—under Major General Willis D. Crittenberger and the 1st Armored Division in reserve) was reinforced by the British XIII Corps, under Lieutenant General Sidney Kirkman. The initial stages went well until the autumn weather began and, as it did the previous year, the advance bogged down.

Early on the morning of January 28, 1944, a PT boat carrying Clark to the Anzio beachhead, six days after the Anzio landings, was mistakenly fired on by U.S. naval vessels. Several sailors were killed and wounded around him. Next month, during the air raid he ordered on Monte Cassino abbey, 16 bombs were mistakenly dropped at the Fifth Army headquarter compound then 17 miles (27 km) away from there, exploding yards from his trailer while he was at his desk inside. A few months later, on June 10, he again narrowly escaped death when, while flying over Civitavecchia, his pilot failed to see the cable of a barrage balloon. The cable entwined the wing, forcing the Stinson L-5 into a rapid downward spiral. The plane broke free of the cable after the third time around, leaving a large section of the wing behind. The fuel tank ruptured, spraying the fuselage with gasoline. Miraculously, the pilot managed to land safely in a cornfield. "I never had a worse experience" wrote Clark to his wife.

15th Army Group
In December 1944 Clark succeeded Alexander as commander of the AAI, renamed the 15th Army Group, and Alexander was made the Supreme Commander of the AFHQ in the Mediterranean, replacing Field Marshal Sir Henry Maitland Wilson, who himself was called to Washington to replace Field Marshal Sir John Dill as head of the British Joint Chiefs of Staff. Succeeding Clark as commander of the Fifth Army was Lieutenant General Lucian Truscott, who had previously commanded VI Corps and, before that, the 3rd Division. Clark was promoted to the four-star rank of acting general on March 10, 1945, aged 48, the youngest in the United States Army. His permanent rank was upgraded to major general on October 7, 1944.

Clark led the 15th Army Group throughout the final months of the Italian campaign, although no major offensives took place, due mainly to a critical shortage of manpower throughout the ranks of both the Fifth and Eighth Armies along with the worsening winter weather. After much retraining and reorganizing, Clark then led the army group in the final offensive in Italy, codenamed Operation Grapeshot, which brought the war in Italy to an end, and he afterwards accepted the German surrender in Italy in May and became Commander of the Allied Forces in Italy at the end of World War II in Europe.

Post-war era
Later in 1945, as Commander in Chief of US Forces of Occupation in Austria, Clark gained experience negotiating with communists, which he would put to good use a few years later. Clark served as deputy to the US Secretary of State in 1947 and attended the negotiations for an Austrian treaty with the Council of Foreign Ministers in London and Moscow. In June 1947, Clark returned home and assumed command of the Sixth Army, headquartered at the Presidio in San Francisco and two years later was named chief of Army Field Forces. On October 20, 1951, he was nominated by President Harry S Truman to be the US emissary to the Holy See. Clark withdrew his nomination on January 13, 1952 after protests from Texas Senator Tom Connally and from Protestant groups.

Congressional inquiry

It was announced on 20 January 1946 that the 36th Infantry Division Veterans' Association had unanimously called for a congressional inquiry into Clark's actions during the 36th Infantry Division's disastrous crossing of the Gari River (erroneously identified as the Rapido) on the night of 20 January 1944. The petition read:

Be it resolved, that the men of the 36th Division Association petition the Congress of the United States to investigate the river Rapido fiasco and take the necessary steps to correct a military system that will permit an inefficient and inexperienced officer, such as General Mark W. Clark, in a high command to destroy the young manhood of this country and to prevent future soldiers being sacrificed wastefully and uselessly.

Two resolutions were heard in the House of Representatives, one of which claimed the incident was "one of the most colossal blunders of the Second World War... a murderous blunder" that "every man connected with this undertaking knew... was doomed to failure."

Clark was absolved of blame by the House of Representatives but never commented on the Rapido River episode.

Korean War

During the Korean War, he took over as commander of the United Nations Command on May 12, 1952, succeeding General Matthew Ridgway, a close friend and a fellow graduate of the West Point class of 1917. Clark commanded the UN forces in Korea until the armistice was signed on July 27, 1953, and retired from the Army on October 31 of the same year.

Later career
From 1954 to 1965, after retiring from the Army, Clark served as president of The Citadel, the military college in Charleston, South Carolina.

From 1954 to 1955, Clark was head of the so-called Clark Task Force to study and make recommendations on all intelligence activities of the Federal government. The task force had been created in 1953 by the second Commission on Organization of the Executive Branch of the Government, or the Hoover Commission, which had been chaired by Herbert Hoover.

Members of the Clark Task Force were Admiral Richard L. Conolly, a former Deputy Chief of Naval Operations; Ernest F. Hollings, the speaker pro tempore of South Carolina's House of Representatives; California businessman Henry Kearns; Edward V. Rickenbacker, World War I flying ace and president of Eastern Air Lines; and Donald S. Russell, a former Assistant Secretary of State. The staff director was Major General James G. Christiansen. The task force first met in early November 1954 and in May 1955 submitted a top-secret report for the president and another that was unclassified for the Hoover Commission and Congress. The Clark task force coined the term Intelligence Community to describe "the machinery for accomplishing our intelligence objectives."
 
Clark wrote two memoirs: Calculated Risk (1950) and From the Danube to the Yalu (1954). His wife, Maurine, also wrote a memoir: Captain's Bride, General's Lady (1956).

In 1962, Clark was elected an honorary member of the South Carolina Society of the Cincinnati in recognition of his outstanding service to his country.

Retirement and death
General Clark retired in 1965 when he stepped down as president of The Citadel. He lived in Charleston, South Carolina, in retirement and died there on April 17, 1984, shortly before his 88th birthday. He was the last surviving American officer who had held four-star rank during World War II. He was buried on the campus of The Citadel.

Awards and decorations

Dates of rank

Personal life
Clark married  Maurine Doran, daughter of  Mr. and Mrs. M. A. Doran of Muncie, Ind., May 17, 1924.  Mrs. Clark died October 5, 1966. Their son was Maj. William Doran Clark,  U.S.A. (Ret.), and their daughter Patricia Ann (Mrs. Gordon H. Oosting). Later in life he married Mary Dean. Patricia Ann did not have any children.  William had 5 children: Louise Clark Goddard, Doran Clark Abrams, D'Wayne Clark Waterman, Helen Clark Atkeson, and Larry Clark.

Mark W. Clark was initiated to the Scottish Rite Freemasonry in the Mystic Tie Lodge No. 398, Indianapolis, IN, receiving the 33rd and highest degree.

Legacy
An interstate spur (I-526) in the suburbs of Charleston, South Carolina, was named Mark Clark Expressway in his honor.

Mark Clark Hall on the campus of The Citadel in Charleston, South Carolina, is named in General Clark's honor.

The General Mark W. Clark National Guard Armory in North Charleston, South Carolina is named in Clark's honor.

From 1949 to August 17, 2010, the Mark Clark Bridge in Washington connected Camano Island with the adjacent town of Stanwood on the mainland. It was then superseded by the Camano Gateway Bridge, and the Mark Clark Bridge was demolished the following month.

Fort Drum's Clark Hall is named after him. Fort Drum is near Clark's Madison Barracks birthplace, and Clark Hall is used for administrative in processing and out-processing soldiers assigned to the 10th Mountain Division.

The term "intelligence community" was created by the federal intelligence-review "Clark Task Force," which he headed from 1953 to 1955. The term remains in use by the US government and by civilians.

He was used in the 1979 novel Kane and Abel as the reason for the Abel character going to World War II.

Two locations in the Brazilian state of Rio de Janeiro—the Academia Militar das Agulhas Negras in Resende, and a street in São Gonçalo—have been named after Clark.

The Agulhas Negras Military Academy Stadium, Brazil ( AMAN ), is named General Mark Clark.

In the neighborhood of Santa Catarina, in the city of São Gonçalo, located in the State of Rio de Janeiro - Brazil, there is a street called Gen. Mark Clark.

Clark used to live on the 12th floor of the Francis Marion Hotel in Charleston, South Carolina. You can now stay in his suite starting at $500 a night.

In film
Clark was portrayed by Michael Rennie in the film The Devil's Brigade. The  film is about the exploits of the 1st Special Service Force, commanded by Colonel Robert T. Frederick, which came under Clark's command in the Italian Campaign.

Clark was portrayed by William Schallert in Ike: The War Years.

Clark is portrayed by Robert Ryan in Anzio (film) under the pseudonym “General Carson”.

General Clark was referred to in the MASH television series, season 11, episode 3: Foreign Affairs. In the episode he created a program that awarded an enemy soldier $100,000 and US citizenship.

See also

Notes

References
 Bibliography

 (first edition 1950)

External links

United States Army Officers 1939–1945
Generals of World War II
 Papers of Mark W. Clark, Dwight D. Eisenhower Presidential Library
Finding aid for the Mark W. Clark Oral History, Dwight D. Eisenhower Presidential Library
 Historical Sound from General Clark (some statements with German translation)
 Biography from the Korean War Encyclopedia
 General Mark W. Clark – TIME magazine cover of July 7, 1952
 From the Liberation of Rome to the Korean Armistice – General Mark Wayne Clark interview – 1975 Three Monkeys Online
  Footage
 Mark W. Clark Collection The Citadel Archives & Museum
 Sidney T. Mathews: General Clark's Decision to drive on Rome. In: Command Decisions (editor: Center for Military History, 2000). CMH Pub 70-7-1; partly edited already in 1960.  Chapter 14  (p. 351–364)
 

1896 births
1984 deaths
American Episcopalians
20th-century American memoirists
United States Army personnel of World War I
United States Army personnel of the Korean War
American people of Romanian-Jewish descent
Civilian Conservation Corps people
Grand Croix of the Légion d'honneur
Grand Crosses of the Order of the White Lion
Grand Officers of the Order of the Crown (Belgium)
Honorary Knights Commander of the Order of the British Empire
Knights Grand Cross of the Military Order of Savoy
Knights of the Order of Saints Maurice and Lazarus
People from Highland Park, Illinois
People from Sackets Harbor, New York
Presidents of The Citadel, The Military College of South Carolina
Recipients of the Distinguished Service Cross (United States)
Recipients of the Distinguished Service Medal (US Army)
Recipients of the Legion of Merit
Recipients of the Order of Suvorov, 1st class
Recipients of the Silver Medal of Military Valor
Recipients of the Silver Cross of the Virtuti Militari
United States Army Command and General Staff College alumni
United States Army War College alumni
United States Army Infantry Branch personnel
United States Military Academy alumni
Recipients of the Navy Distinguished Service Medal
United States Army generals of World War II
United States Army generals
United States Army War College faculty
Military personnel from New York (state)